Rakousy is a municipality and village in Semily District in the Liberec Region of the Czech Republic. It has about 100 inhabitants.

History
The first written mention of Rakousy is from 1540.

References

Villages in Semily District